Novokrestyanovskoye is a rural locality (a selo) in Novokokhanovsky Selsoviet, Kizlyarsky District, Republic of Dagestan, Russia. The population was 965 as of 2010. There are 3 streets.

Geography 
Novokrestyanovskoye is located 17 km northwest of Kizlyar (the district's administrative centre) by road. Novomonastyrskoye and Aleksandro-Nevskoye are the nearest rural localities.

Nationalities 
Nogais, Russians, Dargins and Avars live there.

References 

Rural localities in Kizlyarsky District